Herford is a town in North Rhine-Westphalia, Germany, located in the lowlands between the hill chains of the Wiehen Hills and the Teutoburg Forest.  It is the capital of the district of Herford.

Geography

Geographic location 
The former Hanseatic town of Herford is situated in the chain of hills south of the Wiehen Hills (Ravensberg Hills).  The highest place is the Dornberg (240 m) in the Schwarzenmoor district; the lowest point (56 m) is located in the Werretal in the Falkendiek district.  The River Aa joins the river Werre in the centre of the town.  The Stuckenberg is located east of the town.

Sports
The Herforder EV (Ice Dragons) ice hockey club plays in the Regionaliga, and have enjoyed regular success.  They draw an average of 800 fans.

Neighbouring towns 
 West: Enger, Hiddenhausen
 North: Löhne
 North-East: Vlotho
 South-East: Bad Salzuflen (Lippe district)
 South-West: Bielefeld.

Districts 

 Altstädter Feldmark
 Neustädter Feldmark
 Radewiger Feldmark
 Diebrock¹
 Eickum¹
 Elverdissen¹
 Falkendiek¹
 Herringhausen¹
 Laar¹
 Schwarzenmoor¹
 Stedefreund¹

History
The town was founded in 789 by Charlemagne in order to guard a ford in the narrow Werre river. A century later, Matilda, daughter of Dietrich of Ringelheim, a count of Saxony, grew up in the abbey of Herford; she was a descendant of the Saxon leader Widukind. In Herford she met Henry the Fowler, who later became king of Germany.

In late medieval times Herford was a member of the Hanseatic League. It was a Free Imperial City, i.e. it was directly subordinated to the emperor. This status was lost after the Peace of Westphalia (1648), when Herford was annexed by Brandenburg-Prussia. It was administered within the Province of Westphalia following the Napoleonic Wars, and made part of the new state North Rhine-Westphalia after World War II.

Culture and sights

Sights
 The Herford Minster (Münsterkirche) is a late Romanesque hall church, built about 1220-1250 for the Fürstabtei Herford (Herford monastery). It is one of the earliest hall churches in Germany
 St. James' (Jakobikirche/Radewiger Kirche) is a late Gothic hall church (1330)
 St. John's (St. Johannis/Neustädter Kirche) is a late Gothic hall church (1340)
 St. Mary's (St. Marien auf dem Berge) is also a late Gothic hall church. It was completed about 1325/50 and part of a monastery
 Town hall, built 1913-16 by Paul Kanold in Neo-Baroque forms
 Neustädter Rathaus (former town hall), built 1600, aesthetic pediment 1930 removed, 1988/89 reconstructed
 Remensnider-Haus, Brüderstraße 26, a late Gothic half-timbered building from 1521
 Kantorhaus, Elisabethstraße 2, a half-timbered building, about 1484/1494
 Holland 21, half-timbered building, 1554
 Holland 39, half-timbered building, 1559
 Bürgermeisterhaus, Höckerstraße 4, a late Gothic stone building from 1538 with a stepped gable similar to houses in Münster and Bielefeld
 Frühherrenstraße 11, a Renaissance building, 1591
 Wulfert-Haus, Neuer Markt 2 with a brick-built Renaissance gable, 1560

Museums
The MARTa Herford, a museum for contemporary art and design, housed in a building designed by Frank Gehry, has been open to the public since May 2005. Its exhibits change regularly. The current artistic director is Roland Nachtigäller.

The Daniel-Pöppelmann-Haus in Herford explores the history of the city, and the Memorial and Meeting Place Cell Block, in the basement of the city hall, documents the persecution and the obliteration of minorities. Plans to construct a museum of city history next to the city hall and the Minster church have been postponed.

Music and theatre
Herford is the seat of the Nordwestdeutsche Philharmonie (Northwest German Philharmonic) which performs regularly in the Stadtpark Schützenhof as well as many neighbouring cities in North Rhine-Westphalia. Eugene Tzigane is the principal conductor designate (2010–present).  The current director is Andreas Kuntze.

The Stadttheater (Municipal theatre) provides seats for 706 viewers and it is served by visiting theatre companies.

Events at regular intervals
 Easter Fair around Easter (Oster-Kirmes)
 Jazz Festival May - Performances of different jazz artists in a couple of bars
 Organ Summer
 Visions Fair June
 Summer Stage Summer (Sommerbühne) - Concerts at the square between city hall and market hall
 Hoekerfest August - Municipal festival with plenty of events in the city centre
 City Fair October - In the city centre
 Herbstzeitlos (Autumnally timeless) Autumn - Exhibition at the former depot site
 Wine Festival Autumn - At Gänsemarkt
 Christmas Lights December - Municipal Christmas fair (Weihnachtsmarkt)

Military
Herford was the location of the headquarters of the 1st (United Kingdom) Armoured Division at Westfalen Garrison, part of British Forces Germany, until the division moved to the United Kingdom in 2015.

The British Forces Broadcasting Service (BFBS) studio for Germany was located in Wentworth Barracks until 2009 when it moved to Hohne.

Twin towns – sister cities

Herford is twinned with:
 Hinckley, England, United Kingdom (1972)
 Fredericia, Denmark (1987)

Friendly cities
Herford also has friendly relations with:
 Vodice, Croatia (1974)
 Quincy, United States (1991)
 Gorzów Wielkopolski, Poland (1995)
 Manavgat, Turkey (2008)
 Xinbei (Jiangsu), China (2015)

Notable people
 Heinrich von Herford (c. 1300–1370)
 Gerhard Friedrich Müller (1705–1783), explorer of Siberia
 Karl Ludwig Costenoble (1769–1837), actor and theatre director
 Frederick August Otto Schwarz (1836–1911), founder of FAO Schwarz toystore
 Friedrich Adolf Richter (1847–1910), founder of Richter (toy company)
 Carl Severing (1875–1952), politician (SPD)
 Otto Weddigen (1882–1915), submarine-commander in World War I
 Hermann Höpker-Aschoff (1883–1954), politician (DDP, FDP)
 Karl Steinhoff (1892–1981), Minister-president (Ministerpräsident) of the German state (Land) of Brandenburg
 Reinhard Maack (1892–1969), explorer, geologist and geographer
 Erich Gutenberg (1897–1984), economist
 Heinz Röttger (1909–1977), composer
 Hans Kornberg (1928–2019), biochemist
 Wilhelm Leber (born 1947), mathematician
 Bernd Sponheuer (born 1948), musicologist
 Marian Gold (born 1954), singer-songwriter
 Karl-Heinz Wiesemann (born 1960), 96th Bishop of Speyer
 Jörg Rüpke (born 1962), academic, scholar of comparative religion and classical philology
 Thomas Helmer (born 1965), footballer
 Philipp Heithölter (born 1982), footballer
 Diego Demme (born 1991), footballer

References

External links 

  

Free imperial cities
Herford (district)
Members of the Hanseatic League